A2 National Women's Basketball, also known as A2 Ethniki Women's Basketball is the 2nd-tier level women's basketball league in Greece. It is organized by the Hellenic Basketball Federation (E.O.K.). Each season, the top two placed teams of the league are promoted to the top-tier level Greek women's division.

History
The A2 National began with the 1997–98 season. The league was split into a two groups format (North-South), starting with the 2003–04 season.

Champions

References

External links
Hellenic Basketball Federation 

Basketball leagues in Greece
Greece
Women's basketball competitions in Greece
Professional sports leagues in Greece